The Egyptian magazine ar-Rawi (Arabic: الراوي; DMG: ar Rāwī; English: "The Narrator") was published in Alexandria, part of the Khedivate of Egypt, between 1888 and 1890. A total of 21 issues in two volumes were edited. Founder of the magazine was the Lebanese journalist and author Salim Sarkis (1869-1926). He also published many other magazines which are known as Sarkis journals. According to its subtitle, ar-Rawi particularly focused on topics related to literary and humorous content.

References

External links
 Online-Version: ar-Rāwī
 Further information: www.translatio.uni-bonn.de
 Digital editions: Arabische, persische und osmanisch-türkische Periodika

1888 establishments in Egypt
1890 disestablishments in Egypt
Arabic-language magazines
Defunct literary magazines published in Egypt
Magazines established in 1888
Magazines disestablished in 1890
Mass media in Alexandria
Monthly magazines published in Egypt